Laura Nolte (born 23 November 1998) is a German bobsleigh pilot,  who began competing for the national team in 2015 and won the gold medal in the two-woman bobsleigh event at the 2022 Winter Olympics, becoming the youngest in bobsleigh history to win the title. In 2023 she has become the first European to win the Monobob World Champion title at the Sankt Moritz World Championships, while being also the winner of the 2023 European Monobob Champion title in Altenberg, Germany. In 2021, she won the gold medal in the two-woman event at the IBSF European Championships 2021 held in Winterberg, Germany. In the same season, she also won the gold medal in the two-woman event at the IBSF Junior World Championships 2021 held in St. Moritz, Switzerland.

In 2016, she won the gold medal in the girls' monobob event at the Winter Youth Olympics held in Lillehammer, Norway. In 2020, she competed in the two-woman event at the IBSF World Championships 2020 held in
Altenberg, Germany.

In February 2021, she won the bronze medal in the two-woman event at the IBSF World Championships 2021 held in Altenberg, Germany. She also won the bronze medal in the monobob event.

In February 2022, she won the gold medal in the two-woman competition in bobsleigh at the 2022 Winter Olympics, which was held on 18 February (heats 1 and 2) and 19 February (heats 3 and 4),  at the Xiaohaituo Bobsleigh and Luge Track in Yanqing District of Beijing, achieving three track records during the four runs and becoming the youngest bobsleigh pilot in history to win the title.

In December 2022, Laura Nolte has achieved her first World Cup win in Monobob in Lake Placid, while setting the track record during the first run.  In January 2023, the second Monobob World Cup win followed in Winterberg, then a track record at the first Altenberg Monobob event  of the season and her first Monobob European Champion title in Altenberg.  At the  Monobob event at the IBSF World Championships 2023, held at the  Sankt Moritz Celerina Olympic Bobrun, on 28 and 29 January, Laura Nolte has won her first World Champion title by setting the fastest time in three of the runs and obtaining the track record during the second run.

Career results 
All results are sourced from the International Bobsleigh and Skeleton Federation (IBSF).

World Cup results

Two-woman

Monobob

See also
 List of Youth Olympic Games gold medalists who won Olympic gold medals

References

External links

 
 Laura Nolte at the German Bobsleigh, Luge, and Skeleton Federation 

Living people
1998 births
People from Unna
Sportspeople from Arnsberg (region)
German female bobsledders
Bobsledders at the 2016 Winter Youth Olympics
Youth Olympic gold medalists for Germany
Bobsledders at the 2022 Winter Olympics
Olympic bobsledders of Germany
Olympic gold medalists for Germany
Medalists at the 2022 Winter Olympics
Olympic medalists in bobsleigh
21st-century German women